The Kien Chan was a Chinese-built ship, originally named Toey-Wan, purchased by the French Navy in 1860 and commissioned as an  aviso.

Career 
Purchased in 1860, Kien Chan was used as a hospital ship during the Second Opium War.

In 1861, her engine out of service, she explored the Hai River under Lieutenant Eugène Nielly. In 1863, she explored the Yangtze river up to Hankou, under Ensign Laurens. That same year, while sailing the Shimonoseki Straits, she came under fire from pro-imperial forces of the Chōshū Domain, an event that would lead to the Shimonoseki Campaign; Kien Chan sustained damage to her engine and lost four men.

In 1866, captained by Trève, Kien Chan took part in the French campaign against Korea.

Notes, citations, and references
Notes

Citations

References

Ships built in France
1860 ships